John Francis Dooling Jr. (June 13, 1908 – January 12, 1981) was a United States district judge of the United States District Court for the Eastern District of New York.

Education and career

Born in Brooklyn, New York, Dooling received an Artium Baccalaureus degree from St. Francis College in 1929. He received a Bachelor of Laws from St. John's University School of Law in 1932. He received a Bachelor of Laws from Harvard Law School in 1934. He was in private practice of law in New York City from 1934 to 1961.

Federal judicial service

Dooling was nominated by President John F. Kennedy on September 14, 1961, to the United States District Court for the Eastern District of New York, to a new seat created by 75 Stat. 80. He was confirmed by the United States Senate on September 21, 1961, and received his commission on September 22, 1961. He assumed senior status on November 30, 1976. His service was terminated on January 12, 1981, due to his death.

References

External links
 

1908 births
1981 deaths
St. Francis College alumni
St. John's University School of Law alumni
Harvard Law School alumni
Judges of the United States District Court for the Eastern District of New York
United States district court judges appointed by John F. Kennedy
20th-century American judges
20th-century American lawyers